Madura may mean:

 Madura Island
 Madoera Residency, a Dutch East Indies administrative subdivision
 Madura Station
 Madura Strait
 Madura, Western Australia
 An alternative name for Madurai, India
 Madura (insect), a genus in the family Coreidae
 Madura (rock band)
 Lamborghini Madura - a concept car to be produced by the Italian supercar manufacturer Lamborghini

See also
 Bank of Madura
 Suzuki Madura